Sydyk (in some manuscripts Sydek or Sedek) was the name of a deity appearing in a theogeny provided by Roman-era Phoenician writer Philo of Byblos in an account preserved by Eusebius in his Praeparatio evangelica and attributed to the still earlier Sanchuniathon.

Etymology and role in the Phoenician theogeny
Philo of Byblos gave the Greek meaning of the name as Δίκαιον "Righteousness", thus indicating that the word corresponds to the Semitic root for "righteousness", √ṣdq. A Phoenician god named ṣdq is well attested epigraphically; he is also mentioned by Philo as half of a pair of deities with Misor. Sydyk and Misor are described as being born from Amunos and Magos, who were in turn born from the "Wanderers" or Titans. Sydyk is described as the father of the "Dioskouroi or Kabeiroi or Korybants or Samothracians", who are credited with the invention of the ship.

The Phoenician Sydyk was equated with Roman Jupiter, and hence it has been suggested that Sydyk was connected to the worship of the planet Jupiter as the manifestation of justice or righteousness.

Connection to other Middle Eastern deities
A connection between Sydyk and the Assyro-Babylonian deity Kittu has been proposed. The latter was also referred to as Ṣidqu and additionally the West Semitic name Ammi-ṣaduqa is translated into Akkadian as Kimtum-kittum showing an equivalence of meaning between the West Semitic ṣ-d-q and the Akkadian kittu. Kittu was similarly paired with the god Misharu, whose name is a cognate of Misor ("justice"). In Mari the equivalent deities of Išar and Mešar are found.

An Ugaritic reference to a god named Ṣaduq has also been found, a possible forerunner of Sydyk.

It has also been conjectured that a related deity named or titled "Tzedek" (i.e. "righteousness") was worshipped in pre-Israelite Jerusalem as the names of two kings of the city, Melchizedek and Adonizedek contain the element tzedek. According to one such hypothesis "Tzedek" was an epithet of the god El. However the mainstream understanding of these names (meaning "My King is Righteousness" and "My Lord is Righteousness" respectively) is that they refer to the concept of righteousness and not to a god.

See also
Zadkiel
Tzadik

References

West Semitic gods
Justice gods
Jovian deities